Pora may refer to:

People
 Rizky Pora (born 1989), Indonesian football player
 Rodney Pora, rugby player
 Teina Pora, New Zealander

Places
 Pora (river), Italy
 Monte Pora, Italy
 Ponta Porã, Brazil

Other
 PORA, Ukrainian civic youth organization 
 PORA (Russian youth group)